Calcarenite is a type of limestone that is composed predominantly, more than 50 percent, of detrital (transported) sand-size (0.0625 to 2 mm in diameter), carbonate grains. The grains consist of sand-size grains of either corals, shells, ooids, intraclasts, pellets, fragments of older limestones and dolomites, other carbonate grains, or some combination of these. Calcarenite is the carbonate equivalent of a sandstone. The term calcarenite was originally proposed in 1903 by Grabau as a part of his calcilutite, calcarenite and calcirudite carbonate classification system based upon the size of the detrital grains composing a limestone. Calcarenites can accumulate in a wide variety of marine and non-marine environments. They can consist of grains of carbonate that have accumulated either as coastal sand dunes (eolianites), beaches, offshore bars and shoals, turbidites, or other depositional settings.

References

See also

Limestone